Children's Museum of Southern Minnesota (CMSM) is a children's museum located in Mankato, Minnesota. It features regularly scheduled art and science activities.
Indoor exhibits include an interactive quarry, a tree made of tree forts, and a vertical wind-tunnel. The museum offers seasonal farm exhibits outdoors during the warmer months.

History
A group of educators began efforts to open a children's museum in 2009. In the summer of 2014, flood waters damaged the museum's planned exhibits. After rebuilding the exhibits, CMSM opened on the 1st of May, 2015.

Location
The chosen site of the museum required extensive cleanup in partnership with the Minnesota Pollution Control Agency. With funding from a grant, over 2,500 tons of polluted soil and waste were removed. The existing building was made safe for renovation and use.

References

External links 
 Official site

Children's museums in Minnesota